Vanadzor Technology Center, is a technological center for IT development in Vanadzor, the third-largest city in Armenia. It was opened on 29 October 2016. Founded by the Enterprise Incubator Foundation with the support of Government of Armenia and the World Bank, the project aims to promote the business and technology environment in Lori Province and the entire region of north Armenia.

Mission
The mission of Vanadzor Technology Center is to promote Vanadzor's role as a regional and international center for high technology through the creation of a dynamic environment of opportunities and services. This will lead to promote new job opportunities and will support talented youth and organizations in implementing innovative business ideas. The ultimate goal of the centre is to contribute to the sustainable development of the region.

The fields of the center's activity include business consultancy, mentoring, marketing and promotion, introduction to funding opportunities, and establishment of business connections for increasing the competitiveness of companies in the global marketplace. The centre aims at helping enterprises in expanding activities, putting into use effective management system, attracting investments, developing, introducing and implementing technical innovations, capturing new markets, and developing workforce skills.

References

Buildings and structures in Vanadzor
Educational institutions established in 2016
Educational organizations based in Armenia
2016 establishments in Armenia